Mark Ronald Wells (born  September 18, 1957) is an American former professional ice hockey forward who is best known for being a member of the 1980 U.S. Olympic hockey team.

Amateur career
Mark Wells graduated from Lake Shore High School in St. Clair Shores, Michigan in 1975.  Wells then attended Bowling Green State University from 1975 to 1979 where he was a star forward with the Falcons in the Central Collegiate Hockey Association. Despite his abilities as a player, Wells did not receive a scholarship offer to play hockey until after his first season with the team. Following the completion of his college career, Wells, along with Falcons teammate Ken Morrow, was selected to play on the 1980 U.S. Olympic Men's Ice Hockey team that went on to win the gold medal at Lake Placid.

Professional career

Wells was selected 176th overall in the 1977 NHL Entry Draft by the Montreal Canadiens. He joined Montreal's top farm team the Nova Scotia Voyageurs after the Olympics but was unable to secure a spot on the Canadiens roster. He was traded to the Detroit Red Wings after the 1980 season, however refused the assignment and was released from his contract. Wells then signed as a free agent with the New York Rangers but spent the next two seasons shifting around the minor leagues playing for the New Haven Nighthawks, Flint Generals, Fort Wayne Komets and Oklahoma City Stars. Wells finally retired in 1982 without playing a single game in the NHL.

After playing career
Following his retirement from hockey, Wells worked as a restaurant manager in Rochester Hills, Michigan, but sustained a fractured vertebra while unloading crates. Following eleven hours of surgery, Wells was informed by the doctor that he had a rare degenerative spinal disease. The illness, which affects the disks in the spinal column, forced Wells to retire from work and has required multiple surgeries, leaving him bed-ridden for extended periods and clinically depressed. Wells did, however, manage to suit up for the reunion game with his 'Miracle on Ice' teammates prior to the 2002 Winter Olympics in Salt Lake City—against doctor's orders, playing in one shift and recording a shot on goal.

In 2010, financially struggling from medical bills and in need of finances for further surgery, Wells reluctantly  sold his gold medal medallion to a private collector for $40,000. The medal was later auctioned off by the buyer for $310,700. Having kept the medal on his nightstand for over twenty years, Wells expressed in a 2010 Daily News article how difficult a decision it had been to sell the medal: "It killed me to sell the medal. Killed me. But my life was crumbling. I was going to lose my home. I needed to sell it to have surgery and to live. I had no choice."

Wells is now attending civic events and has spoken at several special venues around his hometown and beyond, including St Clair Shores Lions Club fundraiser, SCS Tree Lighting Ceremony in Dec 2014 and seminar at the Arsenal of Democracy.  Additionally, he has made appearances at state hockey tournaments and various collectors shows around the country.

Mark Wells currently resides in the Upper Peninsula of Michigan.

Awards and achievements

Olympic Gold Medal in Men's Ice Hockey, U.S. Men's Ice Hockey team:  1980
St. Clair Shores, Michigan, city officials rename the St. Clair Shores Civic Arena's Olympia Room as the Mark Wells Ice Rink: 2014

In popular culture
Wells is featured in a 1981 TV movie about the 1980 U.S. hockey team called Miracle on Ice. Jeff Miller, a retired CA State Assemblyman played Mark Wells in the 1981 movie and Wells himself appeared in archival footage of the gold medal ceremony used in the movie.

In the 2004 Disney film Miracle, he is portrayed by Joe Hemsworth.

Career statistics

Regular season and playoffs

International

References

External links
 
 Mark Wells @ hockeydraftcentral.com

1957 births
1980 US Olympic ice hockey team
American men's ice hockey centers
Bowling Green Falcons men's ice hockey players
Flint Generals players
Fort Wayne Komets players
Ice hockey players from Michigan
Ice hockey players at the 1980 Winter Olympics
Living people
Medalists at the 1980 Winter Olympics
Montreal Canadiens draft picks
New Haven Nighthawks players
Nova Scotia Voyageurs players
Oklahoma City Stars players
Olympic gold medalists for the United States in ice hockey
People from St. Clair Shores, Michigan
Sportspeople from Metro Detroit